Ma Ke (1918 – July 27, 1976) was a Chinese composer and musicologist, best known for his patriotic songs, including "Nanniwan".

Ma was born into a Christian family, at Xuzhou, Jiangsu, and his name was said to be derived from the saint Mark. Having enjoyed chemistry in high school, he studied it at Henan University, where he encountered the composer Xian Xinghai. Ma suspended his studies and became a follower of Xian, including an anti-Japanese roadshow tour of the country. In 1939, Ma traveled to Yan'an. On Xian's recommendation, he studied at Luxun Academy of Arts with composer Lü Ji and others. He began to collect and record many Chinese folk songs. In 1947, he joined the Communist Party of China. After 1949, he was appointed the Vice President of the China Conservatory of Music and the head of the Chinese Opera House.

He composed more than 200 musical works, including "Nanniwan"; We are Democratic Youth(我们是民主青年); Powerful Workers (咱们工人有力量); Lüliang Mountains Cantata (吕梁山大合唱); the yangge opera The Couple Learn to Read (夫妻识字); the opera Zhou Zishan (周子山) (co-composed with Zhang Lu and Liu Chi); The White Haired Girl with Ju Wei, Zhang Lu, and Xiang Yu; Xiaoerhei's Marriage (小二黑结婚); and the orchestral piece The North Shanxi Suite (陕北组曲).

As a musicologist, he devoted special study to the work of Xian Xinghai and wrote a biography about the composer. He also studied the development of modern Chinese music drama and China's tradition of revolutionary music, writing several books and approximately 200 papers. In 1978, a partial collection of his songs was published.

A festival dedicated to Ma Ke, called the China Xuzhou Ma Ke Art Festival, was held in Xuzhou in June 2004.

Ma and his wife, Yang Wei, had three daughters: Haixing, Haiying, and Hailing.

References

1918 births
1976 deaths
Chinese musicologists
Academic staff of the Central Academy of Drama
People's Republic of China composers
Chinese male classical composers
Chinese classical composers
Chinese opera composers
Male opera composers
Musicians from Jiangsu
Educators from Xuzhou
People's Republic of China writers
Writers from Xuzhou
Chinese non-fiction writers
20th-century classical composers
20th-century Chinese musicians
Henan University alumni
20th-century musicologists
20th-century male musicians
20th-century non-fiction writers